Willie Murray (born 28 August 1954 in Edinburgh) is a Scottish former footballer, who played for Hibernian, Cowdenbeath and Sydney City.

External links 
Willie Murray, www.ihibs.co.uk

1954 births
Living people
Footballers from Edinburgh
Association football wingers
Scottish footballers
Hibernian F.C. players
Cowdenbeath F.C. players
Sydney City players
Scottish Football League players
Scottish expatriate footballers
Expatriate soccer players in Australia
Scottish expatriate sportspeople in Australia